Dryaderces is a small genus of frogs in the family Hylidae. Their known distribution is disjunct, with one species found in the upper Amazon Basin and lower Andean slopes between central Peru and Amazonian Bolivia, and another one in Pará, Brazil. Its sister taxon is Osteocephalus. No phenotypic synapomorphies defining the genus are known.

Etymology
The generic name Dryaderces is derived from Ancient Greek dryad (=tree) and aderces (=unseen, invisible), thus meaning "unseen in a tree".

Description
They are pond breeders. Males have only scattered, non-spinous tubercles on the dorsum (pond-breeding Osteocephalus have heavily tuberculate dorsum, with the tips of the tubercles keratinized). Females have smoother backs. Juvenile coloration resembles adult coloration (different in Osteocephalus).

Species
There are two species:
 Dryaderces inframaculata (Boulenger, 1882)
 Dryaderces pearsoni (Gaige, 1929)

Before Dryaderces was erected, these two species were placed in Osteocephalus. There is at least one undescribed species belonging to this genus.

References

Hylidae
 
Amphibian genera
Amphibians of South America
Taxa named by Ignacio J. De la Riva
Taxa named by Philippe J.R. Kok
Taxa named by Jiří Moravec (herpetologist)
Taxa named by Ross Douglas MacCulloch
Taxa named by D. Bruce Means
Taxa named by José Manuel Padial
Taxa named by Miguel Trefaut Rodrigues
Taxa named by Josefa Celsa Señaris
Taxa named by Vanessa Kruth Verdade